Richárd Czár (born 13 August 1992) is a Hungarian football player who plays for Puskás Akadémia II.

References
 MLSZ
 HLSZ
 

1992 births
Living people
People from Komló
Hungarian footballers
Association football defenders
Hungary youth international footballers
Budapest Honvéd FC players
Budapest Honvéd FC II players
First Vienna FC players
Soproni VSE players
Dunaújváros PASE players
FC Ajka players
Mosonmagyaróvári TE 1904 footballers
Gyirmót FC Győr players
Budaörsi SC footballers
Puskás Akadémia FC II players
Nemzeti Bajnokság I players
Nemzeti Bajnokság II players
Nemzeti Bajnokság III players
2. Liga (Austria) players
Hungarian expatriate footballers
Expatriate footballers in Austria
Hungarian expatriate sportspeople in Austria
Sportspeople from Baranya County